= Bullbegger, Virginia =

Unincorporated community in Virginia, United States

Bullbegger
- unincorporated community
- Location within Virginia Location within the United States
- Coordinates: 37°57′28″N 75°36′52″W
- Country: United States
- State: Virginia
- County: Accomack
- Time zone: UTC−5 (Eastern (EST))
  - Summer (DST): UTC−4 (EDT)

Bullbegger is an unincorporated community in Accomack County, Virginia, United States.
